The Asia Pacific Parliamentary Forum (APPF) is a group of parliamentary officials from the Asia-Pacific region who wish to discuss matters that affect their region with their government counterparts around the world.  The group was founded in 1993.  It is a branch of the Asia-Pacific Economic Cooperation (APEC). Dan Hays is a past Chair of the APPF's Canadian section.  The Australian National Group was founded in 1995.

References

International organizations based in Asia
International organizations based in Oceania